Memphis Jackson is an album by American jazz vibraphonist Milt Jackson featuring performances with the Ray Brown Big Band recorded in 1969 for the Impulse! label.

Reception
The Allmusic review awarded the album 4.5 stars.

Track listing
All compositions by Milt Jackson except as indicated
 "Uh-Huh" (Ray Brown) - 3:48   
 "One Mint Julep (One Way)" (Rudy Toombs) - 2:33   
 "Oh Happy Day" (Edwin Hawkins) - 3:30   
 "Memphis Junction" - 2:49   
 "Queen Mother Stomp" (Victor Feldman) - 6:30   
 "Braddock Breakdown" (Ray Brown) - 3:40   
 "A Sound for Sore Ears" (Jimmy Heath) - 3:02   
 "Enchanted Lady" - 5:06   
 "One Mint Julep (The Other Way)" (Toombs) - 2:44   
 "Picking Up the Vibrations (Ray Brown) - 4:11  
Recorded at Annex Recording Studios, Hollywood, California on October 9 (tracks 1-3, 6, 7, 9 & 10) and October 10 (tracks 4, 5 & 8), 1969

Personnel
Milt Jackson – vibes
Al Aarons (tracks 4, 5 & 8), John Audino (tracks 1-3 & 9), Bud Brisbois (tracks 6, 7 & 10), Buddy Childers (tracks 1-3 & 9), Harry Edison (tracks 1-3, 6, 7, 9 & 10), Ollie Mitchell (tracks 6, 7 & 10) - trumpet
Randy Aldcroft (tracks 1-3 & 9), Jimmy Cleveland (tracks 6, 7 & 10) - trombone  
Kenny Shroyer - bass trombone (tracks 6, 7 & 10)
John T. Johnson - tuba (tracks 1-3 & 9)
Ernie Watts - alto saxophone (tracks 1-3 & 9)
Jim Horn - alto saxophone, flute, baritone saxophone (tracks 1-3, 6, 7, 9 & 10)
Teddy Edwards - tenor saxophone  (tracks 4-8 & 10)
John Lowe - baritone saxophone (tracks 1-3 & 9)
Mike Melvoin - piano, electric piano (tracks 1-3, 6, 7, 9 & 10)
Joe Sample - electric piano (tracks 4, 5 & 8)
Howard Roberts (tracks 4, 5 & 8), Fred Robinson (tracks 4-8 & 10) - guitar
Ray Brown - bass, conductor
Wilton Felder - electric bass
Cubby O'Brien (tracks 6, 7 & 10), Paul Humphries (tracks 4, 5  8), Earl Palmer (tracks 1-3 & 9) - drums 
Victor Feldman - percussion (tracks 4, 5 & 8)

References 

Impulse! Records albums
Milt Jackson albums
1970 albums